Bertrand Layec (born 3 July 1965) is a former French football referee. He was registered as a Fédéral 1 referee in France meaning he is eligible to officiate Ligue 1 and Ligue 2 matches, as well as matches in the Coupe de France and Coupe de la Ligue. Layec refereed his first match in Ligue 1 in 1998 and, in 2002, became a FIFA official. He refereed his last match on the final day of the 2009–10 season and now serves as the president of the Direction Nationale de L'Arbitrage (DNA). Layec is currently under investigation by the French justice system for defamation of character after distributing an abusive e-mail directed at Bruno Derrien, a former referee who  authored a controversial book directed at his profession.

At international level, Layec officiated at the 2007 FIFA U-17 World Cup, as well as Euro 2008 qualifiers and 2010 World Cup qualifiers.

References

External links
  
 
 
 
 

1965 births
Living people
French football referees
Sportspeople from Vannes